Pataki (English: Firecracker) is an Indian Kannada-language action comedy film directed by Manju Swaraj and produced by S. V. Babu under the banner S.V.Productions. Starring Ganesh and Ranya Rao playing the lead roles while Arjun Janya compose the music. The film was a remake of Telugu film Pataas.

Plot 
Surya is a corrupt IPS officer who gets himself transferred to Bangalore as ACP and misuses his power to gain monetary benefits in unorthodox methods. During this process, he also encourages a local MP named Rudra Prathap, who has become a headache to Agni, the DGP of Bangalore. Surya happens to be Agni's son, who is angry at the latter as his supposed negligence killed his mother and just born sister, though Agni actually left his wife in the hospital to save several families in a riot. Unaware of this, Surya left Agni and joined an orphanage where he became an IPS officer to seek revenge on his father. 

During his life in Bangalore, Kalyan also meets two women; Sangeetha, a journalist, and Manvitha, a deaf-mute philanthropist who works in a coffee shop. He loves Sangeetha and expects her to reciprocate the same only to be rejected by her because of his corrupt nature. Manvitha is killed by Rudra Prathap's son Vicky when she tries to save a techie from being assaulted by him. Surya considered Manvitha as his sister and her death enrages him, so he turns against Rudra Pratap. Rudra Prathap wants to make Vicky a politician while Surya challenges Rudra Prathap to save Vicky from getting arrested. Rudra Prathap manages to kidnap the techie, but with the help of a transgender named Basanti, who is the main witness, Surya arrests Vicky with a non-bailable warrant. He also challenges Rudra Prathap to bring Vicky out of prison within 3 days. 

Agni and Surya are united, and Surya's marriage with Sangeetha is approved. On the third day, Rudra Prathap's men kidnap Basanti and Sangeetha. Agni, along with his team, go to the spot to save Basanti. Surya manages to save Sangeetha, but is very far from the spot but is able to save her. Meanwhile, Agni and his team, along with Basanti, are killed by Rudra Prathap and his partners. The next day, Surya and the officers form a plan and make Vicky escape from custody, where they track him and reaches Rudra Prathap's hideout. A fight ensues, where Surya kills Vicky, Rudra Prathap and his partners, thus avenging Manvitha and his father's death.

Cast
 Ganesh as DSP Surya
 Saikumar as DGP Agni
 Ranya Rao as Sangeetha
 Priyanka Thimmesh as Manvitha
 Ashish Vidyarthi as Rudra Prathap
 Sadhu Kokila as Basanti
 Kuri Prathap as Prathap
 Rockline Sudhakar as Sudakar
 Mohan Juneja as Prabhakara
 Vijay Chendoor as constable

Soundtrack

Arjun Janya has composed the score and songs for the film.

Remakes

References

External links 
 

2017 films
2010s Kannada-language films
Indian action films
2017 masala films
Kannada remakes of Telugu films
Films scored by Arjun Janya
Fictional portrayals of the Karnataka Police
Films shot in Thailand
Films shot in Bangalore
Cross-dressing in Indian films
Films directed by Manju Swaraj
2017 action films